Dickey Glacier is a glacier  long, flowing north along the east side of the Surveyors Range to enter Beaumont Bay, Ross Ice Shelf. It was named by the Advisory Committee on Antarctic Names for Captain Willie M. Dickey, U.S. Navy, commander of the Naval Support Units, Antarctica, at Little America V in winter 1957.

References 

Glaciers of the Ross Dependency
Shackleton Coast